Gudun Gavabar (also Romanized as Gūdūn Gavābar; also known as Godūn Gavābar) is a village in Amlash-e Jonubi Rural District, in the Central District of Amlash County, Gilan Province, Iran. At the 2006 census, its population was 95, in 31 families.

References 

Populated places in Amlash County